Rainbird, Rain Bird or Rainbirds may refer to:

Birds 
 Rainbird, colloquial name given to various birds thought to sing before rain, including the European green woodpecker, Jamaican lizard cuckoo, Pacific koel, channel-billed cuckoo, Burchell's coucal and black-faced cuckoo-shrike, as well as certain swifts whose movements are thought to signal the coming of rain
 Rain Bird (legend), a Native American legendary animal
 Shangyang (rainbird), in Chinese mythology

People 
 Bill Rainbird (1916–1997), New Zealand cricketer
 George Rainbird (1905-1986), British publisher
 Sam Rainbird (born 1992), Australian cricketer
 Victor Noble Rainbird (1887–1936), British painter, stained glass artist and illustrator

Media 
 Rainbirds, 1980s German band centred on singer Katharina Franck
 "Rainbirds", instrumental closing song from Tom Waits' 1983 album Swordfishtrombones
 The Rainbird Pattern, 1972 novel by Victor Canning
 "Rain Bird", 1980s song by Love and Rockets
 The Rainbirds, 1968 novel by Janet Frame
 " Rainbird " , song by Code Kunst , featuring Colde and Tablo

Other 
 Rainbird (software company), software label owned by Telecomsoft and Microprose
 Rain Bird, irrigation supplies manufacturer
 Rainbird (horse)